Treaty of Novgorod, signed on 3 June 1326 in Novgorod, marked the end of decades of the Norwegian-Novgorodian border skirmishes in the far-northern region called Finnmark. The terms were an armistice for 10 years. A few years earlier in 1323, Republic of Novgorod had settled its conflict with Sweden in the Treaty of Nöteborg.

The treaty did not delineate the border but rather stipulated which part of the Sami people would pay tribute to Norway and which to Novgorod, creating a kind of buffer zone in between the countries. The treaty remained in effect until the 19th century and was never abrogated by any of the powers. It eventually led into a situation where Sami people were freely exploited, some of them forced to pay taxes to all surrounding powers at the same time, including to the Birkarls from Swedish Finland.

References

Novgorod 
1326 in Europe
14th century in Norway
Novgorod
Treaties of the Novgorod Republic
Treaties of Norway
14th century in Russia